Rose Glen can refer to:

 Rose Glen (Sevierville, Tennessee) — an NRHP-listed antebellum plantation in Sevierville, Tennessee, US
 Rose Glen Elementary School — a school in Waukesha School District of Wisconsin, US